The 2013 Women's NORCECA Volleyball Championship was the 23rd edition of the Women's Continental Volleyball Tournament. Nine countries competed from September 16 to September 21, 2013 in Omaha, Nebraska, United States. Team USA qualified for the 2013 FIVB Women's World Grand Champions Cup in Japan, after winning the Continental Championship 3-1 to the Dominican Republic. American Kelly Murphy won the MVP Award.

Competing nations
The following national teams have qualified:

Squads

Pool standing procedure
To establish the ranking of teams after Preliminary Round, the ranking of the teams will
be determined as follows:
1. By the results of matches won and lost.
2. In case of equality in the number of matches won and lost, among two or more
teams of the same group, the final ranking of the teams will be determined by the
number of points gained among teams of the same group during the Preliminary
Round.
3. The following points will be awarded to each team per match, according to the
number of sets won/lost:
Match won 3–0: 5 points for the winner, 0 points for the loser
Match won 3–1: 4 points for the winner, 1 point for the loser
Match won 3–2: 3 points for the winner, 2 points for the loser
In case of tie, the teams were classified according to the following criteria:
points ratio and sets ratio.

First round

Pool A

Pool B

Pool C

Final bracket

8th place match

Quarterfinals

Semifinals

7th place match

5th place match

3rd place match

Final

Final standing

Individual awards
MVP: 
Best Scorer: 
Best Spiker: 
Best Blocker: 
Best Server: 
Best Digger: 
Best Setter: 
Best Receiver: 
Best Libero:

All-Star team

Most Valuable Player

Best Setter

Best Opposite

Best Outside Hitters

Best Middle Blockers

Best Libero

References

External links
Official website

Women's NORCECA Volleyball Championship
2013 in volleyball
International volleyball competitions hosted by the United States
2013 in sports in Nebraska
Sports competitions in Omaha, Nebraska
September 2013 sports events in the United States
Volleyball in Nebraska